Paul Ronty (July 12, 1928 – April 22, 2020) was a Canadian professional ice hockey centre.  Ronty started his National Hockey League career with the Boston Bruins in 1947.  He also played for the New York Rangers and Montreal Canadiens.  He retired after the 1955 season.  Three times during his career, he finished sixth in league scoring.

Ronty died on April 22, 2020 in Newton, Massachusetts at the age of 91.

Career statistics

References

External links

1928 births
2020 deaths
Boston Bruins players
Boston Olympics players
Canadian ice hockey centres
Montreal Canadiens players
New York Rangers players
Ice hockey people from Toronto